Nelson Lincoln (April 20, 1914 – March 7, 2000) was an American sports shooter. He competed in the 50 metre pistol event at the 1960 Summer Olympics. Lincoln won two gold medals at the 1959 Pan American Games, and also won silver and bronze at the 1958 ISSF World Shooting Championships.

See also
 List of Pan American Games medalists in shooting

References

External links
 

1914 births
2000 deaths
American male sport shooters
Olympic shooters of the United States
Shooters at the 1960 Summer Olympics
Sportspeople from Medford, Massachusetts
Pan American Games medalists in shooting
Pan American Games gold medalists for the United States
Shooters at the 1959 Pan American Games
Medalists at the 1959 Pan American Games
20th-century American people